Little Ease was a prison cell located beneath the White Tower in the Tower of London. The lightless cell was designed  on a side, meaning that while an adult human could be placed inside, any occupant was prevented from being able to either stand, sit, or lie down, meaning it was impossible for him to find any physical position of rest (i.e., "little ease" could be found).

Evidence suggests that Edmund Campion, a Catholic priest in Elizabethan England, was imprisoned for four days in the cell in July 1581. According to Bell (1921), by tradition, Guy Fawkes was housed there in 1605. Another possible inmate was Miles Prance in 1678. But Bell also stated that there is some doubt that the cell ever actually housed prisoners.

References

Tower of London